The KSCA Stadium (Karnataka State Cricket Association Stadium) is a cricket ground in Belagavi, India. The first recorded match on the ground was in 2016/17. It was used as a venue for two first-class matches in the 2016–17 Ranji Trophy, both featuring Gujarat. In the first of those matches, Priyank Panchal scored a triple-century, when he made 314 not out.

See also
 List of cricket grounds in India

References

External links
KSCA Stadium at CricketArchive

Cricket grounds in Karnataka
2016 establishments in Karnataka